The following is a list of living Catholic bishops of India sorted by ecclesiastical province and diocese. The bishops of India include two major archbishops, one each of the Syro-Malabar and the Syro-Malankara church, and one of the four titular patriarchs of the Latin Church. There are 6 Indian cardinals, 5 of whom are electors. All the Catholic bishops of India are members of the Catholic Bishops Conference of India.

Overview
A summary of the number of bishops in India:
 Major archbishops: 2
 Titular patriarch: 1
 Metropolitan archbishops: 27
 Archbishop-bishops: 2
 Bishops: 118
 Bishops of curia: 2
 Auxiliary bishops: 18
 Archbishops/bishops emeriti: 74
 Bishop-elect: 3
Total: 247

 Cardinal electors:5
 Cardinal non-elector: 1
 Vacant sees: 21

Latin Catholic Provinces

Ecclesiastical Province of Agra
Metropolitan Archbishop Raphy Manjaly of the Archdiocese of Agra

 Bishop Pius Thomas D’Souza of the Diocese of Ajmer
 
 (vacant) Diocese of Allahabad (administered by diocesan administrator)
 
 Bishop Ignatius D’Souza of the Diocese of Bareilly
 Bishop Vincent Nellaiparambil of the Syro-Malabar Catholic Eparchy of Bijnor
 
 Bishop Mar Thomas Thuruthimattam, CST of the Syro-Malabar Catholic Diocese of Gorakhpur
 
 Bishop Oswald Lewis of the Diocese of Jaipur
 Bishop Peter Parapullil of the Diocese of Jhansi
 Bishop Gerald John Mathias of the Diocese of Lucknow
 (vacant) Diocese of Meerut (administered by diocesan administrator)
 Bishop Devprasad John Ganawa, SVD of the Diocese of Udaipur
 Bishop Eugene Joseph of the Diocese of Varanasi

Ecclesiastical Province of Bangalore
Metropolitan archbishop Peter Machado of the Archdiocese of Bangalore

 Bishop Derek Fernandes of the Diocese of Belgaum
 Bishop Henry D’Souza of the Diocese of Bellary
 Bishop Anthony Swamy Thomasappa of the Diocese of Chikmagalur
 Bishop Robert Michael Miranda of the Diocese of Gulbarga
 Bishop Derek Fernandes, apostolic administrator of the (vacant) Diocese of Karwar
 Bishop Peter Paul Saldanha of the Diocese of Mangalore
 
 Archbishop Bernard Moras, apostolic administrator sede plena of the Diocese of Mysore, Metropolitan archbishop emeritus of the Archdiocese of Bangalore
 Bishop Kannikadass William Antony of the Diocese of Mysore
 
 Bishop Francis Serrao, SJ of the Diocese of Shimoga
 Bishop Gerald Isaac Lobo of the Diocese of Udupi

Ecclesiastical Province of Bhopal
Metropolitan Archbishop Alangaram Arockia Sebastian Durairaj, SVD of the Archdiocese of Bhopal

 Bishop Joseph Thykkattil of the Diocese of Gwalior
 
 Bishop Chacko Thottumarickal, SVD of the Diocese of Indore
 Bishop Gerald Almeida of the Diocese of Jabalpur
 (vacant) Diocese of Jhabua (administered by diocesan administrator)
 (vacant) Diocese of Khandwa (administered by diocesan administrator)
 Bishop James Athikalam, MST of the Syro-Malabar Catholic Diocese of Sagar
 
 Bishop Joseph Kodakallil of the Syro-Malabar Catholic Diocese of Satna
 
 Bishop Mar Sebastian Vadakel, MST of the Syro-Malabar Catholic Diocese of Ujjain

Ecclesiastical Province of Bombay
 Cardinal Oswald Gracias, Metropolitan Archbishop of the Archdiocese of Bombay
 Auxiliary Bishop Dominic Savio Fernandes of the Archdiocese of Bombay
 Auxiliary Bishop John Rodrigues of the Archdiocese of Bombay
 Auxiliary Bishop Allwyn D’Silva of the Archdiocese of Bombay
 Auxiliary Bishop Barthol Barretto of the Archdiocese of Bombay
 
 
 Bishop Mar Thomas Elavanal, MCBS of the Syro-Malabar Catholic Diocese of Kalyan
 Bishop Lourdes Daniel of the Diocese of Nashik
 Bishop Thomas Dabre of the Diocese of Poona
 Archbishop ad personam Felix Anthony Machado of the Diocese of Vasai

Ecclesiastical Province of Calcutta
Metropolitan Archbishop Thomas D'Souza of the Archdiocese of Calcutta
 Bishop Salvadore Lobo, apostolic administrator of the (vacant) Diocese of Asansol, bishop emeritus of the Diocese of Baruipur

 Bishop Vincent Aind of the Diocese of Bagdogra
 Bishop Shyamal Bose of the Diocese of Baruipur
 Bishop Stephen Lepcha of the Diocese of Darjeeling
 Bishop Clement Tirkey of the Diocese of Jalpaiguri
 Bishop Nirmol Vincent Gomes, SDB of the Diocese of Krishnagar
 
 Bishop Fulgence Aloysius Tigga of the Diocese of Raiganj

Ecclesiastical Province of Cuttack-Bhubaneswar
Metropolitan Archbishop John Barwa, SVD of the Archdiocese of Cuttack-Bhubaneswar
 (vacant) Diocese of Balasore (administered by diocesan administrator)
 
 Bishop Sarat Chandra Nayak of the Diocese of Berhampur
 Bishop Aplinar Senapati, CM of the Diocese of Rayagada
 Bishop Kishore Kumar Kujur of the Diocese of Rourkela
 Bishop Niranjan Sual Singh of the Diocese of Sambalpur

Ecclesiastical Province of Delhi
Metropolitan archbishop Anil Joseph Thomas Couto of the Archdiocese of Delhi
Auxiliary bishop Deepak Valerian Tauro of the Archdiocese of Delhi

 Bishop Ivan Pereira of the Diocese of Jammu-Srinagar
 Bishop Agnelo Rufino Gracias, apostolic administrator sede plena of the Diocese of Jalandhar, Auxiliary bishop emeritus of the Archdiocese of Bombay
 Bishop Franco Mulakkal of the Diocese of Jalandhar
 Bishop Ignatius Loyola Mascarenhas of the Diocese of Simla and Chandigarh

Ecclesiastical Province of Gandhinagar
Metropolitan archbishop Thomas Ignatius MacWan of the Archdiocese of Gandhinagar
 
 Bishop Athanasius Rethna Swamy Swamiadian of the Diocese of Ahmedabad
 
 
 Bishop Mar Jose Chittooparambil, CMI of the Syro-Malabar Catholic Diocese of Rajkot

Ecclesiastical Province of Goa and Daman
Cardinal Filipe Neri Ferrao, Metropolitan Archbishop Patriarch of the Archdiocese of Goa and Daman
 Bishop Anthony Alwyn Fernandes Barreto of the Diocese of Sindhudurg

Ecclesiastical Province of Guwahati
Metropolitan Archbishop John Moolachira of the Archdiocese of Guwahati
 
 Bishop Thomas Pulloppillil of the Diocese of Bongaigaon
 Bishop Albert Hemrom of the Diocese of Dibrugarh
 
 Bishop Paul Mattekatt of the Diocese of Diphu
 Bishop John Thomas Kattrukudiyil of the Diocese of Itanagar
 Bishop George Palliparambil, SDB of the Diocese of Miao
 Auxiliary Bishop Dennis Panipitchai, SDB of the Diocese of Miao
 Bishop Michael Akasius Toppo of the Diocese of Tezpur

Ecclesiastical Province of Hyderabad
Cardinal Anthony Poola, Metropolitan Archbishop of the Archdiocese of Hyderabad

 Bishop Antony Prince Panengaden of the Diocese of Adilabad
 
 Bishop Bali Gali, apostolic administrator of the (vacant) Diocese of Cuddapah, bishop emeritus of the Diocese of Guntur
 
 Bishop Udumala Bala Show Reddy, apostolic administrator of the (vacant) Diocese of Khammam
 
 (vacant) Diocese of Kurnool (administered by diocesan administrator)
 Cardinal Anthony Poola, apostolic administrator of the (vacant) Diocese of Nalgonda
 
 Bishop Udumala Bala Show Reddy of the Diocese of Warangal

Ecclesiastical Province of Imphal
Metropolitan Archbishop Dominic Lumon of the Archdiocese of Imphal
 Bishop James Thoppil of the Diocese of Kohima

Ecclesiastical Province of Madras and Mylapore
 Metropolitan Archbishop George Antonysamy of the Archdiocese of Madras and Mylapore
 
 Bishop Anthonisamy Neethinathan of the Diocese of Chingleput
 Bishop Lephonse Thomas Aquinas of the Diocese of Coimbatore
 Bishop Arulappan Amalraj of the Diocese of Ootacamund
 (vacant) Diocese of Vellore (administered by diocesan administrator)

Ecclesiastical Province of Madurai
Metropolitan Archbishop Antony Pappusamy of the Archdiocese of Madurai
 Bishop Thomas Paulsamy of the Diocese of Dindigul
 Bishop Nazarene Soosai of the Diocese of Kottar
 
 Archbishop Antony Pappusamy, apostolic administrator of the (vacant) Diocese of Kuzhithurai
 
 Bishop Antonysamy Savarimuthu of the Diocese of Palayamkottai
 
 (vacant) Diocese of Sivagangai (administered by diocesan administrator)
 
 Bishop Savarimuthu Arokiaraj of the Diocese of Tiruchirapalli
 Bishop Stephen Antony Pillai of the Diocese of Tuticorin

Ecclesiastical Province of Nagpur
 Metropolitan Archbishop Elias Joseph Gonsalves of the Archdiocese of Nagpur
 Archbishop Elias Joseph Gonsalves, apostolic administrator of the (vacant) Diocese of Amravati
 Bishop Ambrose Rebello of the Diocese of Aurangabad
 
 Bishop Ephrem Nariculam of the Diocese of Chanda

Ecclesiastical Province of Patna
Metropolitan Archbishop Sebastian Kallupura of the Archdiocese of Patna

 Bishop Peter Sebastian Goveas of the Diocese of Bettiah 
 Bishop Kurien (Ciriaco) Valiakandathil of the Diocese of Bhagalpur
 Archbishop Sebastian Kallupura, apostolic administrator of the Diocese of Buxar
Bishop-elect James Shekhar of the Diocese of Buxar
 Bishop Cajetan Francis Osta of the Diocese of Muzaffarpur
 
 (vacant) Diocese of Purnea (administered by diocesan administrator)

Ecclesiastical Province of Pondicherry and Cuddalore
Metropolitan Archbishop Francis Kalist of the Archdiocese of Pondicherry and Cuddalore
Bishop Lawrence Pius Dorairaj of the Diocese of Dharmapuri
Bishop Francis Antonysamy of the Diocese of Kumbakonam
Bishop Arulselvam Rayappan of the Diocese of Salem

(vacant) Diocese of Tanjore

Ecclesiastical Province of Raipur
Metropolitan Archbishop Victor Henry Thakur of the Archdiocese of Raipur

 Bishop Antonis Bara of the Diocese of Ambikapur
 
 Bishop Mar Joseph Kollamparampil, CMI of the Syro-Malabar Catholic Diocese of Jagdalpur
 Bishop Emmanuel Kerketta of the Diocese of Jashpur
 Bishop Paul Toppo of the Diocese of Raigarh

Ecclesiastical Province of Ranchi
 Metropolitan Archbishop Felix Toppo, SJ of the Archdiocese of Ranchi
 
 Auxiliary Bishop Theodore Mascarenhas, SFX of the Archdiocese of Ranchi
 Bishop Theodore Mascarenhas, SFX, apostolic administrator of the (vacant) Diocese of Daltonganj
 
 Bishop Julius Marandi of the Diocese of Dumka
 (vacant) Diocese of Gumla (administered by diocesan administrator)
 Bishop Jojo Anand of the Diocese of Hazaribag
 Bishop Telesphore Bilung, SVD of the Diocese of Jamshedpur
 Bishop Binay Kandulna of the Diocese of Khunti
 Bishop Visuvasam Selvaraj of the Diocese of Port Blair
 
 Bishop Vincent Barwa of the Diocese of Simdega

Ecclesiastical Province of Shillong
 Metropolitan Archbishop Victor Lyngdoh of the Archdiocese of Shillong
 Bishop Lumen Monteiro, CSC of the Diocese of Agartala
 Bishop Stephen Rotluanga, CSC of the Diocese of Aizawl
 (vacant) Diocese of Jowai (administered by diocesan administrator)
 Bishop-elect Wilbert Marwein of the Diocese of Nongstoin
 Bishop Andrew Marak of the Diocese of Tura
 Auxiliary bishop Jose Chirackal of the Diocese of Tura

Ecclesiastical Province of Thiruvananthapuram
Metropolitan Archbishop Thomas Jessayyan Netto of the Archdiocese of Thiruvananthapuram
 
 Auxiliary Bishop Christhudas Rajappan of the Archdiocese of Thiruvananthapuram
 Bishop James Raphael Anaparambil of the Diocese of Alleppey
 Bishop Vincent Samuel of the Diocese of Neyyattinkara
 Bishop Selvister Ponnumuthan of the Diocese of Punalur
 Bishop Paul Antony Mullassery of the Diocese of Quilon

Ecclesiastical Province of Verapoly
Metropolitan Archbishop Joseph Kalathiparambil of the Archdiocese of Verapoly
 
 Bishop Varghese Chakkalakal of the Diocese of Calicut
 Bishop Joseph Kariyil of the Diocese of Cochin
 
 Bishop Alex Vadakumthala of the Diocese of Kannur
 Bishop Joseph Karikassery of the Diocese of Kottapuram
 Bishop Peter Abir Antonisamy of the Diocese of Sultanpet
 Bishop Sebastian Thekethecheril of the Diocese of Vijayapuram

Ecclesiastical Province of Visakhapatnam
Metropolitan Archbishop Prakash Mallavarapu of the Archdiocese of Visakhapatnam
 Bishop Jaya Rao Polimera of the Diocese of Eluru
 Bishop Bhagyaiah Chinnabathini of the Diocese of Guntur
 Bishop Doraboina Moses Prakasam of the Diocese of Nellore
 Bishop Vijaya Kumar Rayarala, PIME of the Diocese of Srikakulam
 Bishop Joseph Raja Rao Thelegathoti, SMM of the Diocese of Vijayawada

Syro-Malabar Ecclesiastical Provinces

Province of Eranakulam - Angamaly
Major Archbishop Cardinal George Alencherry of the Syro-Malabar Catholic Archdiocese of Eranakulam-Angamaly
Archbishop Andrews Thazhath, apostolic administrator sede plena of the Syro-Malabar Catholic Archdiocese of Eranakulam-Angamaly

Bishop Sebastian Vaniyapurackal of the Curia of the Syro-Malabar Catholic Archdiocese of Eranakulam-Angamaly
Bishop John Nellikunnel of the Syro-Malabar Catholic Diocese of Idukki
Bishop George Madathikandathil of the Syro-Malabar Catholic Diocese of Kothamangalam

Province of Changanassery
Metropolitan Archbishop Joseph Perumthottam of the Syro-Malabar Catholic Archdiocese of Changanassery

Auxiliary Bishop Thomas Joseph Tharayil of the Syro-Malabar Catholic Archdiocese of Changanassery
Bishop Jose Pulickal of the Syro-Malabar Catholic Diocese of Kanjirappally

Bishop Joseph Kallarangatt of the Syro-Malabar Catholic Diocese of Palai

Bishop George Rajendran Kuttinadar, SDB of the Syro-Malabar Catholic Diocese of Thuckalay

Province of Tellicherry
Metropolitan Archbishop Joseph Pamplany of the Syro-Malabar Catholic Archdiocese of Tellicherry

Bishop Lawrence Mukkuzhy of the Syro-Malabar Catholic Diocese of Belthangady
Bishop Joseph Erumachadath, MCBS of the Syro-Malabar Catholic Diocese of Bhadravathi
Bishop Jose Porunnedom of the Syro-Malabar Catholic Diocese of Mananthavady
Auxiliary Bishop Alex Tharamangalam of the Syro-Malabar Catholic Diocese of Mananthavady
Bishop Remigiose Inchananiyil of the Syro-Malabar Catholic Diocese of Thamarassery
Bishop Sebastian Adayanthrath of the Syro-Malabar Catholic Diocese of Mandya

Province of Thrissur
Metropolitan Archbishop Andrews Thazhath of the Syro-Malabar Catholic Archdiocese of Thrissur

Auxiliary Bishop Tony Neelankavil of the Syro-Malabar Catholic Archdiocese of Thrissur
Bishop Pauly Kannookadan of the Syro-Malabar Catholic Diocese of Irinjalakuda
Bishop Peter Kochupuruckal of the Syro-Malabar Catholic Diocese of Palghat

Bishop Paul Alappatt of the Syro-Malabar Catholic Diocese of Ramanathapuram

Archdiocese of Kottayam
Metropolitan Archbishop Mathew Moolakkattu of the Syro-Malabar Catholic Archeparchy of Kottayam
 Auxiliary Bishop Jose Pandarassery of the Syro-Malabar Catholic Archeparchy of Kottayam
 Auxiliary Bishop Gheevarghese Mar Aprem (born George Kurisummoottil) of the Syro-Malabar Catholic Archeparchy of Kottayam

Directly under the Holy See
Archbishop ad personam Kuriakose Bharanikulangara of the Syro-Malabar Diocese of Faridabad
Auxiliary bishop Jose Puthenveettil of the Syro-Malabar Diocese of Faridabad
Bishop Sebastian (Jobby) Pozholiparampil of the Syro-Malabar Diocese of Hosur
Bishop Raphael Thattil of the Syro-Malabar Diocese of Shamshabad
 Auxiliary Bishop Joseph Kollamparambil of the Syro-Malabar Diocese of Shamshabad
 Auxiliary Bishop Thomas Padiyath of the Syro-Malabar Diocese of Shamshabad

Syro-Malankara Ecclesiastical Provinces

Province of Trivandrum
Major Archbishop Cardinal Baselios Cleemis of the Syro-Malankara Major Archeparchy of Trivandrum
Auxiliary bishop Mathew Manakkarakavil of the Syro-Malankara Major Archeparchy of Trivandrum
Auxiliary bishop Antony Kakkanatt of the Curia of the Syro-Malankara Major Archeparchy of Trivandrum
Bishop K.M. Vincent Kulapuravilai of the Syro-Malankara Eparchy of Marthandom
Bishop Joshuah Ignathios Kizhakkeveettil of the Syro-Malankara Eparchy of Mavelikara
Bishop Thomas Eusebios Naickamparampil of the Syro-Malankara Eparchy of Parassala
Bishop Samuel Irenios Kattukallil of the Syro-Malankara Eparchy of Pathanamthitta

Province of Tiruvalla
Metropolitan Archbishop Thomas Mar Koorilos of the Syro-Malankara Catholic Archeparchy of Tiruvalla
Bishop Joseph Konnath of the Syro-Malankara Catholic Eparchy of Bathery
Bishop Yoohanon (John) Theodosius Kochuthundil of the Syro-Malankara Catholic Eparchy of Muvattupuzha and Apostolic Visitor for Syro-Malankara faithful resident in Europe and in Oceania

Bishop George Kalayil of the Syro-Malankara Catholic Eparchy of Puthur

Directly under the Synod of the Syro-Malankara Church
 Bishop Anthony Valiyavilayil, OIC, archiepiscopal administrator of the (vacant) Syro-Malankara Catholic Eparchy of St. Ephrem of Khadki

Directly under the Holy See
 Bishop Anthony Valiyavilayil, OIC of the Syro-Malankara Catholic Eparchy of St. John Chrysostom of Gurgaon

Indian bishops serving abroad

Diocesan bishops and equivalent
 Archbishop Alex Thomas Kalayanil, SVD of the Archdiocese of Bulawayo, Zimbabwe 
 Bishop Joy Alappat of the St. Thomas the Apostle Syro-Malabar Diocese of Chicago, USA 
 Bishop Philippos Stephanos Thottathil, Apostolic Exarch of the Syro-Malankara Exarchate of the USA 
 Bishop Georges Varkey Puthiyakulangara, MEP of the Diocese of Port-Bergé, Madagascar 
 Bishop Jose Kalluvelil, Apostolic Exarch of the Syro-Malabar Diocese of Mississauga  
 Bishop Joseph Srampickal (born Benny Mathew) of the Syro-Malabar Catholic Eparchy of Great Britain 
 Bishop Varghese Thottamkara, CM, Vicar Apostolic of the Apostolic Vicariate of Nekemte, Ethiopia 
 Bishop Paul Simick, Vicar Apostolic of the Apostolic Vicariate of Nepal 
 Bishop Stephen Chirappanath, Apostolic Visitor for the Syro-Malabar faithful in Europe 
 Bishop Rozario Menezes, SMM of the Diocese of Lae, Papua New Guinea 
 Bishop Siby Mathew Peedikayil, HGN of the Diocese of Aitape, Papua New Guinea 
 Bishop Anthony Pascal Rebello, SVD of the Diocese of Francistown, Botswana 
 Bishop Earl Kenneth Fernandes of the  Diocese of Columbus, USA (Indian Origin) 
 Bishop-elect John Panamthottathil, CMI of the St. Thomas the Apostle Syro-Malabar Diocese of Melbourne, Australia

Apostolic nuncios and papal representatives
 Archbishop Francis Assisi Chullikatt, Apostolic Nuncio to Bosnia and Herzegovina , Apostolic Nuncio to Montenegro 
 Archbishop Kurian Mathew Vayalunkal, Apostolic Nuncio to Algeria , Apostolic Nuncio to Tunisia

Retired
 Archbishop Blasco Francisco Collaço, Apostolic Nuncio emeritus to Swaziland , Lesotho , South Africa , Namibia  and Botswana 
 Archbishop George Panikulam, Apostolic Nuncio Emeritus to Uruguay 
 Archbishop George Kocherry, Apostolic Nuncio Emeritus to Bangladesh 
 Bishop emeritus Jacob Angadiath of the St. Thomas the Apostle Syro-Malabar Diocese of Chicago, USA 
 Bishop emeritus Bosco Puthur of the St. Thomas the Apostle Syro-Malabar Diocese of Melbourne, Australia

Apostolic nuncio 
 Archbishop Leopoldo Girelli , Apostolic Nuncio to India

Indian cardinals
 Electors
 Cardinal Mar George Alencherry, Major Archbishop of Ernakulam–Angamaly and Head of the Syro-Malabar Church, age 
 Oswald Cardinal Gracias, Metropolitan Archbishop of Bombay, age 
 Cardinal Mor Baselios Cleemis, Major Archbishop of Trivandrum and Head of the Malankara Catholic Church, age 
 Filipe Neri Cardinal Ferrao, Metropolitan Archbishop Patriarch of the Goa and Daman, age 
 Anthony Cardinal Poola, Metropolitan Archbishop of the Hyderabad, age 

Non-elector
 Telesphore Placidus Cardinal Toppo, Metropolitan Archbishop of Ranchi, age

See also
 List of Roman Catholic dioceses in India
 List of cathedrals in India
 Territories of Roman Catholic dioceses in India
 Catholic Bishops Conference of India

Footnotes

References

 Catholic Bishops' Conference of India website
 GCatholic.org
 Catholic Hierarchy

Bishops
 
India religion-related lists